Susie Eisenhuth is an Australian theatre and film critic who has reviewed Australian film for many decades.

Career
Eisenhuth was a film critic for the Sydney Morning Herald, The Sun-Herald and the Sunday Telegraph (Sydney) as well as working as a radio producer at 702 ABC Sydney, where she still hosts a film review program. In the early 1990s, she accepted a position at the University of Technology Sydney, as a lecturer in journalism.

Eisenhuth was a weekly columnist for The Bulletin from 1996 to 2002, resigning in 2002 after a much-publicised dispute with the editor-in-chief, Paul Bailey, who cut sections from her column where she cited Oscar Wilde's play, The Importance of Being Earnest and linked his critique of media hypocrisy with recent coverage of the much-criticised politician Cheryl Kernot.

Eisenhuth is a founding member of the International Association for Literary Journalism Studies (IALJS) and is also books editor of the international peer-reviewed journal Literary Journalism Studies. She is also an active committee member of Sydney PEN Centre advocating for freedom of expression.

She currently reviews film for the online arts journal Stage Noise, edited by the former News Limited arts editor and now University of Sydney alumni magazine editor, Diana Simmonds.

References

Living people
Australian women journalists
Australian freelance journalists
Year of birth missing (living people)